The Korg X3 is a music workstation produced by Korg in 1993. The X3 features 200 programs, 200 combinations, 32-voice polyphony, a 32,000 note, 16-track sequencer with 100 patterns and 10 songs and a double-sided, double-density 3.5-inch floppy disk drive for song and other data storage types. Korg also released the X2 (76-key) with 8 Mbyte ROM (6Mbyte X3 + 2Mbyte new piano) in 1994 along with a rackmount version dubbed the X3R, which also had a floppy disk drive.

Many of its samples come from the T3 Series and 01/W Series synthesizers. The X3 features 339 samples compressed into 6 megs of ROM, and Korg beefed up this model in areas where previous models had been weak (organs and strings, for example).

The X3 lacked several key piano samples that had become popular in the M1 and 01/W series, replacing them with different samples altogether which were (arguably) not as good-sounding as before. They eventually brought back some of the classic Korg sounds (like the M1 piano) in the X5D and future Korg products.

References

Further reading

External links
 Korg official site

X3
Music workstations
Digital synthesizers
Polyphonic synthesizers